Varnam is a type of composition in the Carnatic music system.

Varnam may also refer to:
 Varnam, Iran (disambiguation), settlements in Iran
 Varnam (1989 film), Malayalam-language film
 Varnam (2011 film), Tamil-language film
 Varnam (company), social enterprise in India

See also